Sveti Vid-Miholjice is a village in the west of the island of Krk, in the Primorje-Gorski Kotar County. Administratively it belongs to the municipality of Malinska-Dubašnica.

Sveti Vid is located in the immediate vicinity of Malinska.

Description 
Sveti Vid-Miholjice is a typical Krk village with small stone houses.  Because of its authentic appearance it was placed under the protection of the Ministry of Culture of the Republic of Croatia.

In Scully's Sculpture Area are the remains of an Early Christian church called Cickini from the 6th century.,.

There is a small museum in the village with artifacts from the Cickini archaeology dig.  The parish church of St. Michael is located in the center of the village. Every September 29 the village celebrates the day of the patron - the Chakavian Miho.

Population 
After the municipal seat of Malinska, Sveti Vid-Miholjice is the largest settlement in the Malinska-Dubašnica municipality. According to the 2001 census, there were 256 residents.

The movement of the population of St. Vitus has had no significant growth and decline, as is the case with most of the settlements on the island of Krk. Nevertheless, there is an increase in population growth in the second half of the 19th and early 20th centuries as well as in almost all of the villages; with 219 inhabitants in 1857 to a maximum of 363 inhabitants in 1910.  In the mid-20th century there was stagnation and then depopulation.  In 1981 the smallest number of inhabitants of Sveti Vid were recorded since official data existed. Due to the good traffic link and the strong development of tourism in the neighboring Malinska, since 1981, the number of inhabitants has gradually increased.

References 

 
Populated places in Primorje-Gorski Kotar County